The Thouaret is a  river in the Nouvelle-Aquitaine region in western France. It is a right tributary of the Thouet.

Its source is in the commune of Chanteloup, and its course crosses the department of Deux-Sèvres, where it flows northeast through the towns of La Chapelle-Saint-Laurent, Chiché and Saint-Varent, finally flowing into the Thouet near Thouars.

References

Rivers of France
Rivers of Nouvelle-Aquitaine
Rivers of Deux-Sèvres